The men's basketball tournament at the 2019 Pacific Games was held in Apia, Samoa from 8–16 July. In the final, it was Guam who would take gold with a nine point victory over Tahiti. Fiji ended up with the bronze.

Format

Participating teams
Eight countries have qualified and are expected to compete in the men's basketball tournament:

Entrants

Group stage
All times are local (UTC+13)

Group A

Group B

Final round

Classification 7th-8th

Playoffs

Classification 5th-6th

Semifinals

Bronze medal match

Final

Final standing

References

Basketball at the 2019 Pacific Games
Pacific